Song Ki-seok (Korean: 송기석, born 28 October 1963) is a South Korean judge, lawyer and politician. He once served as a member of National Assembly in West District in Gwangju.

Born at Goheung County, Song attended to Konkuk University. He passed to the judicial examination in 1993 and became a judge. He gained popularity while working as a judge.

Song entered to People's Party in the early 2016, and declared to run as MP for West District 1st constituency. Despite of a controversy during the primary, Song was officially selected as the candidate. He then defeated Song Kap-sok of Democratic Party. However, he was involved in a corruption case and lost his membership on 8 February 2018. His position was then succeeded by Song Kap-sok, his ex-rival.

He is currently working as a lawyer.

Election results

General elections

References

External links 
 Song Ki-sok on Blog

1963 births
Living people
South Korean politicians